The 2018 Northeast Conference men's basketball tournament was the postseason men's basketball tournament for the Northeast Conference for the 2017–18 NCAA Division I men's basketball season. All tournament games were played at the home arena of the highest seed, on February 28, March 3, and March 6, 2018. The No. 4 seed LIU Brooklyn defeated No. 1 seed Wagner in the championship game to earn the NEC's automatic bid to the NCAA tournament.

Seeds
The top eight teams in the Northeast Conference were eligible to compete in the conference tournament. Teams were seeded by record within the conference, with a tiebreaker system to seed teams with identical conference records.

On February 17, 2018, Wagner defeated LIU Brooklyn to win the NEC regular season championship outright, their second regular season championship in the previous three years, and received the No. 1 seed.

Schedule and results

Note: Bracket is re-seeded after quarterfinal matchups, with highest remaining seed playing the lowest remaining seed in the semifinals.

Bracket and results
Teams are reseeded after each round with highest remaining seeds receiving home court advantage.

References

External links
2018 Northeast Conference Men's Basketball Championship

Northeast Conference men's basketball tournament
Tournament
Northeast Conference men's basketball tournament
Northeast Conference men's basketball tournament